Raipura is an Upazila of Narsingdi District in the Narsingdi District belonging to Dhaka Division.

Demographics
At the 1991 census Raipura had a population of 413,766, of which 204,212 were aged 18 or older. Males constituted 51.58% of the population, and females 48.42%. Raipura had an average literacy rate of 22.5% (7+ years), against the national average of 32.4%.

Administration
Raipura Upazila is divided into Raipura Municipality and 24 union parishads: Amirganj, Adiabad, Alipura, Banshgari, Chander Kandi, Chandpur, Char Aralia, Char Madhua, Char Subuddi, Daukar Char, Hairmara, Maheshpur, Morjal, Mirzanagar, Mirzapur, Mirzarchar, Musapur, Nilakhya, Palashtali, Paratali, Radhanagar, Roypura, Sreenagar, and Uttar Bakharnagar. The union parishads are subdivided into 107 mauzas and 239 villages.

Raipura Municipality is subdivided into 9 wards and 23 mahallas.

Education
There are several school and college located in this upazila. Raipura College is the most populer college in this upazila which located in Raipura Pourashava. Rahima Haque Chetana Bikash Mohila College is the only Girls College of this Upazila. There is a girls school named Shatadal Girl's High School on the same campus of Rahima Haque Chetana Bikash Mohila College. There are some good school such as Sirajnagar M A Pailot High School, Raipura R K R M High School, Al-Haz Bazlul Haque J. M. High school Pirijkandi High School, Pirijkandi Lakshmipur Hashem Khan Alim Madrasah etc.

See also
 Upazilas of Bangladesh
 Districts of Bangladesh
 Divisions of Bangladesh

References

Upazilas of Narsingdi District